Normacusine B (vellosiminol) is a hypotensive isolate of Strychnos atlantica.

References

Tryptamine alkaloids
Indoloquinolizines
Quinolizidine alkaloids
Heterocyclic compounds with 5 rings